The rockrunner (Achaetops pycnopygius), also known as the  Damara rock-jumper, is a species of African warbler, formerly placed in the family Sylviidae. It is the only member of the monotypic genus Achaetops.
It is found in Angola and Namibia.

References

External links
 Rockrunner - Species text in The Atlas of Southern African Birds.

African warblers
Birds of Southern Africa
Birds described in 1852
Taxa named by Philip Sclater
Taxonomy articles created by Polbot